Mass transit refers to shared transportation services used by the general public.

Mass transit may also refer to:

 Rapid transit, high-capacity public transport generally found in urban areas
 Mass Transit incident (professional wrestling), a professional wrestling incident that occurred in 1996
 Mass Transit Railway, the rapid transit railway system in Hong Kong
 Mass Transit Super Bowl, a transportation plan for the 2014 Super Bowl

See also 
 
 MassTransit (disambiguation)
 Mass transfer, motion of matter